Martin Beck is a fictional police detective, created by Maj Sjöwall and Per Wahlöö.

Martin Beck may also refer to:

People
Martin Beck (ice hockey) (born 1933), German ice hockey player
Martin Beck (vaudeville) (1867–1940), American vaudeville mogul
Martin Beck (painter) (born 1962), contemporary American artist
Martin L. Beck, American architect, artist, and professor of architecture
Martin Beck (artist) (born 1963), American artist, exhibition designer and professor of art and design methodology

Other
Martin Beck Theatre, a Broadway theatre in New York City
Mrs. Martin Beck (1889–1978), American vaudeville performer, theatre manager, co-founder of the American Theatre Wing, and wife of the vaudeville mogul

Beck, Martin